Vengikkal is the Suburb of Tiruvannamalai city and a census town in the Tiruvannamalai district
of Tamil Nadu state of Indian sub-continent.

It lies north to the world famous Tiruvannamalai city. The Divisional and District Government offices of Tiruvannamalai including Tiruvannamalai district collectorate, Tiruvannamalai Transport division headquarters of TNSTC and Tirvannamalai Medical college, government hospital are present in Vengikkal municipal limits.

Demographics
It has the population of 62,000 in 2011 census and  it is 65% higher than 
15,890, its 2001 population.

Railway Transport
Nearest Railway Station is Tiruvannamalai at 4.6 km Situated on Katpadi-Villupuram Railway route.

Road Transport
The local Bus stops are at Thendral Nagar, EB Office, Vengikkal, Collector Office on Vellore Road.
TNSTC Bus Depot, Idukkupillayar Koil, Kubera Lingam on Kanchi Road.
Krishna Nagar and Seriyandhal on Avalurpet Road.

Nearest Airport
The nearest airport is at Chennai, which is located 174 km (107 mi) from vengikkal.

Government Museum
All New Government Museum Tiruvannamalai is situated at Vengikkal.

Tiruvannamalai Sipcot
Tiruvannamalai Sipcot is there in Vengikkal. PVC pipes and Granites manufacturing small scale industries are there.

Water Source
vengikkal has a large Lake opposite to the district Collectorate.

Banks
Indian Bank inside Collectorate Campus, Union Bank at Thendral Nagar (formerly Corportion Bank), SME Brach Of State Bank of India at Vanavil Nagar, Canara Bank, HDFC bank, IDFC first bank, Kotak Mahindra Bank.

Cities and towns in Tiruvannamalai district